Bruno Henrique Marques Torres (born 22 September 1999), known as Bruno Marques or Bruninho, is a Brazilian footballer who plays as a forward for Portuguese club Arouca, on loan from Santos.

Club career

Early career
Born in Recife, Pernambuco, Bruno Marques started to impress while playing for Lagarto's under-19 squad. He made his first team debut on 18 February 2018, playing 25 minutes in a 0–1 Campeonato Sergipano away loss against Freipaulistano.

Bruno Marques scored his first senior goal on 24 March 2018, netting a last-minute winner in a 2–1 home success over Olímpico. In July, he was loaned to Fluminense, returning to the youth setup.

Santos
In September 2018, Bruno Marques was loaned to Santos for one year, and was assigned to the under-20 squad. On 9 December of the following year, his loan was extended for a further season.

Bruno Marques started the 2020 campaign with the B-team, being the top goalscorer of the side in the Campeonato Brasileiro de Aspirantes with seven goals. He made his first team – and Série A – debut on 28 November 2020; after coming on as a second-half substitute for Kaio Jorge, he scored his team's third in a 4–2 home win against Sport Recife.

Bruno Marques made his Copa Libertadores debut on 1 December 2020, again replacing Kaio Jorge in a 0–1 home loss against LDU Quito. Late in the month, the club announced the extension of his loan deal until the end of February, with a permanent four-year deal subsequently arranged, after exercising the buyout clause of R$ 600,000 on his contract. His new contract was signed on 1 March.

Arouca (loan)
On 25 January 2022, Bruno Marques moved to Portuguese Primeira Liga side Arouca on loan until June 2023.

Career statistics

References

External links
Santos FC profile 
Clã do Futebol profile 

1999 births
Living people
Sportspeople from Recife
Brazilian footballers
Association football forwards
Campeonato Brasileiro Série A players
Lagarto Futebol Clube players
Santos FC players
Primeira Liga players
F.C. Arouca players
Brazilian expatriate footballers
Brazilian expatriate sportspeople in Portugal
Expatriate footballers in Portugal